Garches is a commune in the western suburbs of Paris, France.

Garches has remained largely residential, but is also the location of Raymond Poincaré University Hospital, which specialises in traumatology, road accidents and physiotherapy.

Population

Sites of interest

19 January Monument
The northern part of Garches was largely destroyed in the Battle of Buzenval on 19 January 1871, when besieged Parisian forces under Louis Jules Trochu attempted to break through the German blockade and join the French troops at Versailles. Monuments in Rue du 19 janvier and Rue du Colonel de Rochebrune commemorate the events.

Church of St. Louis
Construction of the church began in 1298 following the canonisation of St. Louis, as recorded on the plaque at the entrance. It was the first church in France dedicated to St. Louis. The original church was partly destroyed in the Battle of Buzenval; it was rebuilt in 1876 and restored beginning in 1980 with the 19th-century stained-glass windows and continuing in 1983 with the complete restoration and enlargement of the organ. The spire was rebuilt in 1988, the cross reconsecrated in 1989, the carved tympanum restored in 1990, and interior and façade renovation carried out beginning in 1995. A bell dated to 1787 was classified as a historic monument on 27 April 1944.

The cemetery adjacent to the church was moved in 1930 and contains the graves of some well-known people, including jazz musician Sidney Bechet, who chose to spend his last years in Garches.

Transport
Garches is served by Garches–Marnes-la-Coquette station on the Transilien Paris-Saint-Lazare suburban rail line and by 9 bus lines linking it with Paris and other suburbs.

Education
Public schools:
Three preschools: École maternelle Ramon, École maternelle Saint-Exupéry, École maternelle Pasteur
Three elementary schools: École élémentaire Pasteur A, École élémentaire Pasteur B, and École élémentaire Gaston Ramon
Collège Henri Bergson, a junior high school
A special high school, E.R.E.A. Jacques Brel (for students with handicapped motor skills)

Specialized senior high schools in the area include:
 Lycée Jean Monnet - Montrouge
 Lycée Toulouse Lautrec - Vaucresson

There is a private school in the commune, Ecole Jean-Paul II.

See also
Communes of the Hauts-de-Seine department

References

External links

Official site

Communes of Hauts-de-Seine